Wei Yiyin (born September 1962) is a Chinese space scientist currently serving as deputy general manager of the China Aerospace Science and Industry Corporation. He is a member of the Chinese Society of Astronautics (CSA).

Biography
Wei was born in Tai'an County, Liaoning, in September 1962. He obtained his Doctor of Engineering degree from Harbin Institute of Technology.

He entered the workforce in August 1984, and joined the Communist Party of China in December 1995. He a member of the 12th National Committee of the Chinese People's Political Consultative Conference.

Honours and awards
 2013 Fellow of the International Academy of Astronautics (IAA)
 June 2018 Guanghua Engineering Science and Technology Award
 November 2018 Engineering Construction Technology Award of the Ho Leung Ho Lee Foundation
 November 22, 2019 Member of the Chinese Academy of Engineering (CAE)

References

1962 births
Living people
People from Tai'an County
Scientists from Liaoning
Harbin Institute of Technology alumni
Members of the Chinese Academy of Engineering